Matthew Huang is a Canadian competitive swimmer.

At age 15, Huang qualified for the Canada National Swimming team. In 2000, he qualified as a member of the Canadian Olympic Swimming team to compete in Sydney, Australia.  Huang would go on to represent Canada at many international swimming competitions but only re-emerged in 2005 as a national team member to attend the World Aquatics Championships in Montreal and the World Student Games in İzmir, Turkey.

References

Living people
Canadian male swimmers
Canadian sportspeople of Chinese descent
University of British Columbia alumni
Competitors at the 2005 Summer Universiade
Year of birth missing (living people)